The A Tidewater District is a high school conference in the state of Virginia that comprises high schools located northwest of the Hampton Roads metropolitan area.  The Tidewater District schools compete in A Region A with the schools from the A Eastern Shore District, the A Northern Neck District, and the A Tri-Rivers District of the Virginia High School League.

Member schools
 King William High School of King William, Virginia
 Middlesex High School (Virginia) of Saluda, Virginia
 West Point High School of West Point, Virginia
 Mathews High School of Mathews, Virginia
 King and Queen Central High School of King and Queen Courthouse, Virginia

Virginia High School League